Daniel Herschlag (born October 16, 1958) is an American biochemist and Professor of Biochemistry at the Stanford University School of Medicine. His research uses an interdisciplinary approach to advance our understanding of the fundamental behavior of RNA and proteins.  He is well known for his application of rigorous kinetic and mechanistic approaches to RNA and protein systems.

Education 

Herschlag received a B.S. in Biochemistry from Binghamton University in 1982.  He began his graduate studies at University of Minnesota then moved on to complete his PhD in Biochemistry at Brandeis University under W.P. Jencks in 1988.

Career 

Herschlag was a Helen Hay Whitney Postdoctoral Fellow at the University of Colorado at Boulder from 1989 to 1992.  He conducted post-doctoral research on the mechanism of the newly discovered RNA self-splicing reaction in the lab of Tom Cech.

In 1992, Herschlag joined the faculty of the Biochemistry department in the Stanford University School of Medicine, earning tenure in 1997. He was promoted to full professor in 2002.

In 2011, he was appointed the Senior Associate Dean of Graduate Education and Postdoctoral Affairs for the Stanford University School of Medicine.

Selected awards 
Pfizer Award in Enzyme Chemistry, 1997
Cope Scholar Award from the American Chemical Society, 2000
ASBMB William Rose Award, 2010
National Academy of Sciences Inductee, 2018
Biophysical Society Founders Award, 2020

Selected publications

Personal 
Herschlag currently lives in Menlo Park, CA with his wife and two children.

See also
List of RNA biologists

References

External links 
Herschlag Lab Website
Stanford University School of Medicine Biochemistry Department
Stanford Community Academic Profile, Daniel Herschlag

1958 births
Living people
Stanford University School of Medicine faculty
American biochemists
Brandeis University alumni
Binghamton University alumni
Fellows of the American Association for the Advancement of Science
University of Minnesota alumni
University of Colorado Boulder alumni